A cricket team from England, organised by the Marylebone Cricket Club, toured India and Sri Lanka in the 1976-77 cricket season. They played five Test matches against the India national cricket team, with England winning three matches, India winning one and the other one being drawn. The MCC team played four matches in Sri Lanka after leaving India, but Sri Lanka was not yet a Test-class team.

Test matches

1st Test

2nd Test

3rd Test

4th Test

5th Test

References

External links
 Tour home at ESPNcricinfo
 

1976 in English cricket
1976 in Indian cricket
1977 in English cricket
1977 in Indian cricket
1977 in Sri Lankan cricket
1976-77
1977
Indian cricket seasons from 1970–71 to 1999–2000
International cricket competitions from 1975–76 to 1980
Sri Lankan cricket seasons from 1972–73 to 1999–2000